(born 2 September 1936) was a Japanese sailor. He competed in the Finn event at the 1960 Summer Olympics.

References

External links
 

1936 births
Living people
Japanese male sailors (sport)
Olympic sailors of Japan
Sailors at the 1960 Summer Olympics – Finn
Sportspeople from Ehime Prefecture